The Fighting Gentleman is a 1932 American pre-Code sports-drama film directed by Fred C. Newmeyer with William Collier, Jr. and Josephine Dunn in the leads.

Cast
William Collier, Jr. - Jack Duncan aka The Fighting Gentleman
Josephine Dunn - Jeanette Larkin
Natalie Moorhead - Violet Reed
Crauford Kent - Claude Morgan
Lee Moran - Mr. Hurley
Pat O'Malley - Dot Moran
James J. Jeffries - Himself, James J. Jeffries, Referee
Hughie Owen - Benny Strickland
Mildred Rogers - Irene
Patty O'Flynn - Barker
Duke R. Lee - Announcer

References

External links

1932 films
American sports drama films
Films directed by Fred C. Newmeyer
1930s sports drama films
1932 drama films
1930s American films
1930s English-language films